Sir Thomas Le Strange (1494–1545) of Hunstanton, Norfolk, born in 1494, son of Robert le Strange (d. 1511), sixth in descent from Hamo le Strange, brother of John le Strange, 6th Baron of Knockyn, was Esquire of the Body to Henry VIII, and attended the King when he went to the Field of the Cloth of Gold in 1520; he was knighted by Henry at Whitehall in 1529, and served as High Sheriff of Norfolk in 1532.

Extracts from the Household Accounts kept at Hunstanton in the time of Sir Thomas and his successor, from 1519 to 1578, were published in the Archæologia in 1833. Sir Thomas was in attendance on Anne Boleyn at her coronation in 1533, her father, Sir Thomas Boleyn, being a Norfolk neighbour, who is mentioned repeatedly in the above accounts as a visitor at Hunstanton. In 1536 Sir Thomas Le Strange was appointed to attend on the King's person during the Pilgrimage of Grace, and to bring fifty men with him; in July of that year, he was placed on the commission to inquire into the revenues of the wealthy abbey of Walsingham, near his own Norfolk estate. It is to his credit that, though a personal friend of the King, and employed on business connected with the Dissolution of the Monasteries, Sir Thomas does not appear to have used his influence at court to secure for himself any church lands whatever. His picture, by Holbein, hung at Hunstanton Hall in 1893, according to his descendant Hamon le Strange, and a pencil sketch of him is among the Holbein drawings at Windsor; both these were exhibited at the Tudor Exhibition in 1890. 

In the 1530s he retired to his native Norfolk, where he earned a prosperous living from sheep farming.

Sir Thomas Le Strange died on 16 January 1545, and was buried at Hunstanton.

Family 

He was the son of the abovementioned Robert le Strange, and Margaret, daughter and one of the heirs of Thomas le Strange of Walton in Warwick, Esq. His sister Katherine (d.1564) married 1) Sir Hugh Hastings of Elsing in Norfolk, knight; and 2) Thomas Gawdy (d.1556), Serjeant-at-law. His sister Elizabeth (d.1536) married John Wotton of Tudenham in Norfolk, Esq., the brother of Henry Wotton. Sir Thomas Le Strange refers to him as "my brother Wotton" in his household accounts. As Elizabeth's widower John married secondly Mary, daughter of George Neville, 5th Baron Bergavenny, and widow of Thomas Fiennes, lord Dacre of the South. The son of Elizabeth and John Wotton, also called John, had a daughter: Anne Wotton, who married Bassingbourne Gawdy, the son of her great-aunt Katherine's last husband.

He married Anne Vaux, daughter of Nicholas Vaux, 1st Baron Vaux of Harrowden and his first wife Elizabeth Fitzhugh.

Children of Sir Thomas Le Strange and Anne Vaux:

 Sir Nicholas le Strange (1 January 1511 – 19 February 1580) of Hunstanton, Norfolk, Member of Parliament, m. 1) Eleanor, daughter of William Fitzwilliam (Sheriff of London) of Milton, Northamptonshire, in 1528, with whom he had three sons and two daughters; 2) Katherine, the daughter of John Hyde of Hyde, Dorset and widow of Nicholas Mynn of Great Fransham, Norfolk, in 1546
 Richard le Strange, 2nd son (born before August 1517) of Hunstanton and King's Lynn, Norfolk; later of Kilkenny, Ireland, Mayor of Waterford and Member of Parliament, m. Dorothy Astley, one son
 Elizabeth, m. John Cresenor of Morley in Norfolk, gentleman
 William le Strange, 3rd son
 John le Strange, 4th son
 Roger le Strange, 5th son
 Henry le Strange, 6th son
 Thomas le Strange (1518–1590) 7th son, Member of the Irish House of Commons and the Privy Council of Ireland m. Margaret Bathe, widow of Nicholas Shaen, two daughters
 William le Strange
 Alice, the wife of Calthorp
 Anne, m. Anthony Southwell, the brother of Sir Richard Southwell, Sir Robert Southwell and Francis Southwell
 Katherine, m. Sir Rowland Clark of Tonge in Essex, knight

References 

1494 births
1545 deaths
People from Hunstanton
English knights
Le Strange family